Army general is the second highest military rank in Russia, inferior only to a marshal and superior to a colonel general. It is a direct counterpart of the Soviet Army General rank.

At present it is also the highest rank in the air force, artillery, aerospace defense forces, armored troops, engineer troops and signal troops, unlike the Soviet Union where similarly ranked officers were called marshals and chief marshals of a branch. The corresponding naval rank is admiral of the fleet.

On appointment as Defence Minister on 7 May 1992, Pavel Grachev was the first officer to be promoted to this rank. Vladimir Yakovlev was promoted to this grade while serving as commander of the Strategic Missile Forces (1997–2001).

Rank insignia 
Since 2013, the rank insignia has been one big star and the army emblem on straps which was also used until 1997, as in the Soviet Army since 1974. Between 1997 and 2013, the rank insignia was four stars in a row, as in the Soviet Union from 1943 to 1974.

Until 1997 generals wore a "small" marshal's star. But when, in 1993, the ranks of chief marshal and marshal of the branch in Russian Federation were abolished, there was no more reason for a special rank insignia for generals. By the President's decree of January 27, 1997, generals regained 1943-like straps with four stars in a row.

List of Russian army generals

See also
 Army ranks and insignia of the Russian Federation
 Aerospace Forces ranks and insignia of the Russian Federation

References

Military ranks of Russia
Lists of Russian and Soviet military personnel